The Mikhaylovka culture, Lower Mykhaylivka culture (3600—3000 BCE) is a Copper Age archaeological culture which flourished on the Pontic steppe from 3600 BC to 3000 BC. 

Lower Mikhaylovka culture is named after an early Yamna site of the late copper age of the lower Dnieper River, noted for its fortifications. 

Lower Mykhalivka culture is named after lower archaeological layer of the site near Mykhaylivka village of Kherson Oblast.

Mikhaylovka I (3600-3400 BCE) had connections to the west, and is related to the Kemi Oba culture (3700-2200 BCE) at the Bug-Dniepr area and the Crimea, and seems to have had connections to the Maykop culture (3700-3000 BCE).

Mikhaylovka II (3400-3000 BCE) had connections to the east, as reflected by its Repin-style pottery. Mikhaylovka II is divided into a lower (3400-3300 BCE) and an upper level (3300-3000 BCE). Mikhaylovka II shows a shift from farming to cattle herding, typical for the Yamna horizon.

References

Sources

 
 

Indo-European archaeological cultures
Archaeological cultures of Eastern Europe
Archaeological cultures in Ukraine
Chalcolithic cultures of Europe